The hundred dollar bill may refer to banknotes (bills) of currencies that are named dollar.

 Australian one-hundred-dollar note
 Canadian one-hundred-dollar note
 United States one-hundred-dollar bill